Chaparral High School is a public high school located in Scottsdale, Arizona, in the United States. Its mascot is the firebird, and the school colors are black, red, and gold.

Chaparral opened in February 1973 with 800 students, comprising freshman, sophomore, and junior classes. The principal was Spencer Saunders Sr. The initial structures were built at a cost of $3.5 million. Chaparral's first graduates were the class of 1974.

The original campus was designed by Varney, Sexton, Sydnor Associates. TGK Construction Company built the campus with construction starting in 1971.

In 2008 many of the outdated buildings were demolished and replaced with new ones designed by Orcutt | Winslow Architects. 

In 2014, Newsweek ranked Chaparral No. 22 among top American high schools, and No. 1 in Arizona.

Student body and academics

Chaparral High School has consistently ranked in Newsweeks list of Best High Schools in America. In 2007, Chaparral High School was one of only 12 schools ranked in Arizona.

The high school holds the state record for having the most National Merit Scholars in one year (37 in 2014). Additionally, the school has also earned the record most in-state Presidential Scholars in Arizona, with 17 in 2003.

Former Principals 
Joshua Pantier (2022-Present)

Todd Dreifort (2018-2022)

Dr. Angela Chomokos (2017-2018)

Gayle Holland

Mary Lou Mucino

Dr. John Kreikard

Kim Greenwalt

John Paul Jones

Evelyn Caskie

Tom Smith

Notable alumni

Athletes and coaches 

 Max Aaron (born 1992), figure skater
Brian Bannister, baseball player for the Kansas City Royals
 Chance Adams, baseball player for the Kansas City Royals
 Charles Brewer, baseball player for the Arizona Diamondbacks
 Darrell Bevell, football coach for the Miami Dolphins and former quarterback
 Daniel Coulombe, baseball pitcher for the Oakland Athletics
 Dylan Cozens, baseball player for the Philadelphia Phillies
 Kenny Dillingham, Offensive Coordinator for Oregon
 Ike Davis (born 1987), baseball player for the New York Mets, Oakland Athletics
 Brianna and Nicole Garcia-Colace, professional twin wrestlers known in the WWE as the Bella Twins or Brie and Nikki Bella. 
 Danielle Kamela, professional wrestler known in the WWE as Vanessa Borne
 Paul Konerko, former baseball player for the Chicago White Sox
 Taylor Lewan, professional football player for the Tennessee Titans
 Craig Roh, former football player for the Carolina Panthers
 Taylor Ruck, one of first two Olympic medalists born in the 21st century
 Wes Schweitzer, football player for the New York Jets
 Lyle Sendlein, former football player for the Arizona Cardinals
 Kyle Williams, former football player for the San Francisco 49ers

Entertainment and media
 Dustin Lee Abraham, actor, producer and screenwriter
 Jason Bellini, journalist, lead news anchor for CBS News on Logo, former CNN correspondent
 Alexandra Bracken, author
 Ashley Brewer, TV personality for ESPN
 Lauren Hildebrandt, pop singer, dancer, and actress
 Kongos, band
 Stephenie Meyer, author of Twilight book series
 Jenny Mollen, actor and author
 Tyler Niknam, Twitch streamer, Male Activist (SquadW)
 Busy Philipps, actress

References

Educational institutions established in 1973
Public high schools in Arizona
Education in Scottsdale, Arizona
Schools in Maricopa County, Arizona
1973 establishments in Arizona